Rathtala is a neighbourhood in Balurghat, Dakshin Dinajpur, West Bengal, India. It comes under the jurisdiction of Ward No. 18 of Balurghat Municipality.

Balurghat